Eudociminus is a genus of pine weevils in the beetle family Curculionidae. There are at least two described species in Eudociminus.

Species
These two species belong to the genus Eudociminus:
 Eudociminus mannerheimi Boheman, 1836
 Eudociminus mannerheimii (Boheman, 1936) (cypress weevil)

References

Further reading

 
 
 

Molytinae
Articles created by Qbugbot